Jörg Schwanke (born 12 January 1969 in Peitz) is a retired German football player who is now coach of Hertha BSC II.

Schwanke made 59 appearances for VfL Bochum in the Bundesliga during his playing career. Before the German reunification the midfielder played in the last East German international.

References

External links 
 
 
 

1969 births
Living people
People from Spree-Neiße
People from Bezirk Cottbus
German footballers
East German footballers
Footballers from Brandenburg
East Germany international footballers
Association football midfielders
Bundesliga players
2. Bundesliga players
FC Energie Cottbus players
FC Energie Cottbus II players
VfL Bochum players
1. FC Union Berlin players
Rot Weiss Ahlen players
SV Babelsberg 03 players
SC Paderborn 07 players
Dresdner SC players
Berliner FC Dynamo players
SV Germania Schöneiche players
DDR-Oberliga players